Mulkey may refer to:

Surnames
Frederick W. Mulkey, a United States Senator from Oregon
John H. Mulkey, American justice of the Supreme Court of Illinois
Kim Mulkey, American college basketball coach
William O. Mulkey, a United States Representative from Alabama
Jacob D Mulkey Florida man

Other
 Mulkey (harbor vessel) -- patrolled Portland, Oregon, see Karl Prehn

See also
Mulki (disambiguation)